Marsippospermum is a genus of plant in family Juncaceae described as a genus in 1809.

The genus is native to New Zealand, southern South America, and Falkland Islands.

 Species
 Marsippospermum gracile (Hook.f.) Buchenau - New Zealand (South Island + Antipodean Islands)
 Marsippospermum grandiflorum (L.f.) Hook. - central + southern Chile, southern Argentina, Falkland Islands
 Marsippospermum philippii (Buchenau) Hauman - southern Chile, southern Argentina
 Marsippospermum reichei Buchenau - southern Chile, southern Argentina

References

 
Poales genera